This is a list of notable NMP (Nginx, MySQL/MariaDB, PHP) solution stacks for all computer platforms; these software bundles are used to run dynamic Web sites or servers.

Alternate/similar software stacks 
  AMP - Apache, MariaDB, Perl/PHP/Python on Windows, macOS, Linux and others
 LAPP - Linux, Apache, PostgreSQL, Perl/PHP/Python
 LLMP - Linux, Lighttpd, MySQL/MariaDB, Perl/PHP/Python

Lists of software